{{Infobox AFL biography
| name = Tim Evans
| image = 
| birth_date = 
| birth_place = Tasmania
| death_date = 
| death_place = 
| originalteam = Penguin (NWFU)
| height = 189 cm
| weight = 96 kg
| position = Full forward, half back
| statsend = 1986
| years1 = 1971–1974
| club1 = Geelong
| games_goals1 = 59 (26)
| years2 = 1975–1986
| club2 = Port Adelaide
| games_goals2 = 230 (993)
| games_goalstotal = 289 (1019)
| sooyears1 = 1979–1983
| sooteam1 = South Australia
| soogames_goals1 = 10 (41)
| careerhighlights = 
Club
 Port Adelaide's greatest team (full-forward)
4x Port Adelaide Premiership Player (1977, 1979, 1980, 1981)
2nd SANFL all-time goalkicker (992)
 1st All-Time goals kicked for Port Adelaide (992)
6x SANFL leading goal-kicker (1977, 1978, 1980, 1981, 1982, 1984)
10x Port Adelaide leading goal-kicker (1975, 1977, 1978, 1979, 1980, 1981, 1982, 1983, 1984, 1985)

Representative
 10 games for South Australia
Honours
 South Australian Football Hall of Fame (2002)
 Tasmanian Football Hall of Fame (2008)
 SANFL life member (1984)
 Port Adelaide life member (1984)

Early life 
Originally from Tasmania, Evans played for Penguin Football Club in the North West Football Union.

Geelong (1971-1974) 
Evans was recruited by Geelong in 1971, where he spent four seasons at half back.

Port Adelaide (1975-1986) 
In 1975, he joined Port Adelaide and went on to play 230 games for the club. He won the club's goalkicking with 64 that year.

After a season used in defence, he was moved to full forward in 1977 by coach John Cahill and was an immediate success, leading the league with 88 goals, including seven in Port Adelaide's Grand Final win over Glenelg. He repeated the performance in 1978, kicking 90 for the season.

Evans first kicked over 100 goals in 1980 when he kicked a then-SANFL record 146 goals, and would win the league's inaugural Ken Farmer Medal in 1981 kicking 98 for the season.

Evans retired at the end of the 1986 season. He had kicked 993 goals, the second highest total in SANFL history behind North Adelaide's Ken Farmer (who kicked 1,417 between 1929 and 1941), and 1,019 in his career, the 12th highest total in elite Australian rules football.

Evans also kicked 41 goals in 10 games for South Australia in interstate football, and a further 51 goals in 18 games in pre-season and night series competition.

He played in Port Adelaide's 1977 and 1979-81 premiership teams as well as playing full back in the losing 1976 Grand Final to Sturt in front of the SANFL record crowd of 66,897 at Football Park, and also in the losing 1984 Grand Final.

Evans topped the SANFL's goalkicking six times, and was Port's leading goalkicker ten times.

Honours 
He was an inaugural inductee into the South Australian Football Hall of Fame in 2002 and was inducted into the Tasmanian Football Hall of Fame in 2008. Tim Evans is also a Port Adelaide Life Member, an SANFL player Life Member (for having played 200 games) and was selected at full forward in Port Adelaide's Greatest Team of players from 1870-2000.

References

External links
 

1953 births
Living people
Australian rules footballers from Tasmania
Geelong Football Club players
Port Adelaide Football Club (SANFL) players
Port Adelaide Football Club players (all competitions)
Penguin Football Club players
South Australian Football Hall of Fame inductees
Tasmanian Football Hall of Fame inductees